In mathematics, a quasivariety is a class of algebraic structures generalizing the notion of variety by allowing equational conditions on the axioms defining the class.



Definition

A trivial algebra contains just one element.  A quasivariety is a class K of algebras with a specified signature satisfying any of the following equivalent conditions.

1.  K is a pseudoelementary class closed under subalgebras and direct products.

2.  K is the class of all models of a set of quasiidentities, that is, implications of the form , where  are terms built up from variables using the operation symbols of the specified signature.

3.  K contains a trivial algebra and is closed under isomorphisms, subalgebras, and reduced products.

4.  K contains a trivial algebra and is closed under isomorphisms, subalgebras, direct products, and ultraproducts.

Examples

Every variety is a quasivariety by virtue of an equation being a quasiidentity for which n = 0.

The cancellative semigroups form a quasivariety.

Let K be a quasivariety. Then the class of orderable algebras from K forms a quasivariety, since the preservation-of-order axioms are Horn clauses.

References

Universal algebra